The 90th Scripps National Spelling Bee was held at the Gaylord National Resort & Convention Center in National Harbor, Maryland (its seventh year at this location) from May 30 to June 1, 2017, with "Bee Week" events running for spellers between May 28 and June 3, and televised coverage on May 31 and June 1. Ananya Vinay, 12, won the competition by successfully spelling "marocain" in the final round. In fact, she made history as he had placed 172nd place in the 2016 Scripps National Spelling Bee, and then she won the 2017 edition. There is a remarkable moment when Shourav Dasari correctly spelled "Mogollon" in five seconds.

Competition

291 entrants
There were 291 entrants. To date, this was second only to the 293 who spelled in the 2009 bee. They came from all 50 U.S. states, the District of Columbia, U.S. territories American Samoa, Guam, Puerto Rico, and U.S. Virgin Islands, as well as Department of Defense schools in Europe. Six other countries also have entrants: the Bahamas, Canada, Ghana, Jamaica, Japan, and South Korea. A link to the results may be found at https://secure.spellingbee.com/public/results/2017/round_results 

The spellers ranged from age 6 to 15, made up of 138 girls and 153 boys. 66% attended public schools, 23% private or parochial schools, and the rest either attended a charter school or are home schooled.
For the first time, a 5-year-old qualified for Bee, Edith Fuller of Tulsa, Oklahoma, though she turned 6 by the time of the national Bee. There were 20 spellers this year age 10 or younger. The largest age group was 13, with 99 contestants. Seventy-three spellers were return contestants: 56 two-time contestants, 14 three-time contestants, and three were participating in their fourth national Bee.

According to a report on the eve of the Bee in the Associated Press, there were three "consensus favorites" to win the competition, including Shourav Dasari (of Conroe, Texas and winner of the Houston area bee), Siyona Mishra (who finished 9th last year), and Tejas Muthusamy (a four-time Bee speller). Mishra and Muthusamy did advance to the final 15, Dasari placed 4th.

Day One and Day Two
The Bee began on the morning of Tuesday, May 30, 2017, when the contestants took their opening written test (the "first round"). On Wednesday May 31 there were two oral spelling rounds (the "second" and "third" round of competition), where a missed word results in elimination. After the first oral round ("Round 2"), 259 spellers of the original 291 remained (32 were eliminated).(31 May 2017). Round 2 results, Twitter (Canton Repository editor) Halfway through round three, the field was reduced to 222 spellers, and at the end of round three, 188 spellers remained.

The results from the oral spelling rounds were then combined with the written test scores to determine the group of finalists to compete on Thursday, which could not exceed 50 spellers. Only 40 finalists were announced; it took 23 out of 30 points on the written test, plus an additional 6 points (3 points for correctly spelling in each of the two oral rounds), to become a finalist.

Day Three – Morning
The final day of the Bee began at 10am EDT on June 1, 2017, with the 40 finalists remaining, and was broadcast on ESPN2. After an afternoon break, the final spellers competed in the evening.

After Round 4 (the first round of day 3), 6 more spellers were eliminated, leaving 34 competitors. Twelve-spellers were eliminated in Round 5, leaving 22 (11 boys and 11 girls). Seventeen spellers survived Round 6. After two more spellers dropped in Round 7, the final 15 advanced to the evening finals.

The fifteen finalists were:
 Rohan Sachdev (Speller 27) – Cary, North Carolina
 Erin Howard (36) – Huntsville, Alabama
 Mira Dedhia (75) – Western Springs, Illinois
 Shrinidhi Gopal (114) – San Ramon, California
 Tejas Muthusamy (143) – Glen Allen, Virginia
 Sreeniketh Vogoti (167) – Saint Johns, Florida
 Saketh Sundar (187) – Elkridge, Maryland
 Alice Liu (191) – St. Louis, Missouri
 Raksheet Kota (200) – Katy, Texas
 Naysa Modi (210) – Monroe, Louisiana
 Rohan Rajeev (235) – Edmond, Oklahoma
 Shourav Dasari (254) – Spring, Texas
 Alex Iyer (259) – San Antonio, Texas
 Ananya Vinay (264) – Fresno, California
 Shruthika Padhy (278) – Cherry Hill, New Jersey

Day Three – Evening
The 15 finalists began the final rounds at 8:30pm EDT on June 1. Four spellers dropped in the first evening round (Round 8), and five in the next round, leaving six spellers. The final two spellers were Ananya Vinay, 12, of Fresno, California, and Rohan Rajeev, who continued to spell their words correctly for some time. After Rohan missed "marram", Ananya correctly spelled "gifblaar", and then spelled "marocain" for the win.

Third place went to Mira Dedhia, missing "ehretia", the first word in the Championship Rounds, and fourth place went to Shourav Dasari, who missed "Struldbrug".

Prizes
As in the prior year's bee, the first place prize was $40,000 (among other prizes), and second place was $30,000. Ananya also traveled to New York to appear on Live with Kelly and Ryan and Los Angeles to appear on Jimmy Kimmel Live!.

New tiebreaker test
After three straight years where the Bee ended in a tie, the Bee's rules were amended to include a written tiebreaker test for those remaining on the last evening of the Bee. Those spellers were given a written test (at 6 p.m. on Thursday) with 12 words and 12 vocabulary questions. If either two or three spellers remained after 25 rounds, the highest score on the tiebreaker test would have decided the winner. If the tiebreaker test results were also a tie, only then would co-champions (which could be two or three spellers) be announced. The tiebreaker did not need to be used in this edition of the Scripps National Spelling Bee.

Word list championship round

References

90th
90th Scripps National Spelling Bee
2017 in Maryland
2017 in education
Garshom Awardees
May 2017 events in the United States
June 2017 events in the United States